Get Awkward is the second and most recent album by Be Your Own Pet. It was released on March 18, 2008. Rolling Stone listed the album as the 45th best of 2008.

UK track listing

US track listing
Three tracks—"Black Hole", "Becky" and "Blow Yr Mind"—were removed by Universal lawyers for being "too violent".  They were later released in the US on the EP Get Damaged.

References

External links

2008 albums
Be Your Own Pet albums
XL Recordings albums
Ecstatic Peace! albums